Macau is a Special Administrative Region of the People's Republic of China.  It was formerly a colony of Portugal, which left a legacy of linguistic and other cultural elements. The music is called Macanese music, a mixture of Cantonese and Portuguese music.

This kind of hybrid music had its boom in early 20th century and the groups that used to perform it were called "Tunas". In Portugal, the "tuna" groups consisted of young men which would get together at universities and form estudiantina-like groups, but in Macau, this kind of musical group took a different orientation, blending it with Carnival ballroom celebrations and street festivities. 
The repertoire consisted of carnival marches, ballads, waltzes, cantonese-inspired ballads, fados, polkas, etc.

One of the most known songs from this period was the version in Patuá for the Brazilian carnival march "Mamãe eu Quero", which received the title "Mama Sa Filo". Also, the popular Portuguese song "Oh Careca tira a bóina" (Portuguese for: Hey bald man, take off the beret) received also a Macanese version, named "Sium Careca”; also worth of mention are the version in patuá for the fado song "Uma Casa Portuguesa", named "Unga Casa Macaísta" and the songs "Bastiana" and "Assi Sa Macau". This last one is a composition of the cultist of patuá language in the territory, the poet, composer and theatre director José dos Santos Ferreira, nicknamed "Adé", a prolific composer of music in patuá.

The Macanese group Tuna Macaense, with which Adé was closely associated, emerged in 1935 and still perform today, although with some changes in its line-up. It currently has eight members (António Lopes – mandolim, guitar, vocal and percurssion; Rui Coelho – mandolim, bass, solo guitar and singing; Filomena Jorge – bass, rhythm guitar, solo guitar and singing; Carlos Pereira – drums and percussion; Judas Manhão Jorge – solo guitar; Pedro Santos – bass and percurssion; Isabel Carvalhal – singing and percussion; A Yiu - keyboard).

The Musical institutions in the city include the Macau Orchestra,the Macau Youth Symphony Orchestra and the Macau Conservatory, which has played an important role in music education in the area since its foundation in 1991.  The Macao International Music Festival is an important annual event.

One of the most important Chinese musicians, Xian Xinghai, was born in Macau.

The pop music in Macau is still in an early period. However, the boy band Soler has gone to Hong Kong develop their music career.

Indie Band Scene
Throughout the years since the 80's, the indie scene has been considered a minor scene in Macau. Currently the live venue Live Music Association is the only Live House in Macau which is hosting regular shows.

List of bands

Special Force - awarded the Champion in Carlsberg music festival 1991 and also took the Best Vocal, Best Guitars & Best Bass Guitar awards. The members are: brothers Lawrence Lei (Vocals) & Leo Lei (Drums), John Ho & Jose da Silva (Guitars) and Angelo de Assis (Bass Guitar). Special Force disbanded in 1993

Defender - awarded the first winner up in Carlsberg music festival 1991, Byran Cheng  (Vocal)Lao Song Fai(Vocal) 
Yan Ung (Guitar), Joives Leong (Guitar), Ricky Wu (Drum) , Gabriel Ho (Bass) 
Dr. - released their debut album OD in 2003 although they've been act as the main alternative music pioneer for several years.

L.A.V.Y. - the name of the band is made up by the first letter of the band members Leo(Drums), Angelo (Bass Guitar and Backing Vocals), Vincent (Vocals) and Yaz (Guitars). Although the band is formed in 2007, but each member is highly experienced and well respected musicians in Macao, their strong music portfolio guarantees a powerful performance whenever they hit the stage. L.A.V.Y. started songwriting in 2008 with lyrics about personal experiences. The band, featuring pithy, melodious songs that are good at bringing out the elegance in rock music. Released their debut album "My Lonely Journey" in late 2012, produced by Macau-based Producer Eric M.Y. Chan who is known for fronting the Alternative Rock band Forget the G.

Forget the G - 3 piece band formed with Eric Chan aka e:ch (Vocal/ Guitar), Frog Wong (Piano) and Fi Chan (Drums).  Their unique approach and variation on music styling has been widely praised by fellow artists and music critics in the region over the years. The vocalist/ guitarist of the band Eric is also known as Producer & Engineer for other indie bands in Macau, Hong Kong & Taiwan.

References

Culture of Macau
Macau
Macau